Daniel Lopar (born 19 April 1985) is a Swiss football goalkeeper. He has most recently played for SC Brühl.

Club career

Western Sydney Wanderers

23 May 2019, Western Sydney Wanderers (WSW) announced the signing of Daniel Lopar on a free transfer. Lopar started his first match for the Wanderers in the blockbuster pre-season friendly match against Leeds United. Daniel along with his WSW teammates were defeated 2-1 by Leeds thanks to a 95th-minute goal. Lopar made his competitive debut for Western Sydney, starting the match, in the FFA Cup round of 32. WSW defeated Perth Glory 2-1 and advanced to the round of 16. Daniel played his inaugural A-League match for Western Sydney in the Wanderers' 2-1 round one victory over Central Coast Mariners. Daniel made a number of crucial saves during the match.

15 January 2020, Lopar signed a new two-year contract extension keeping him at the club until the end of the 2021–22 A-League season. Although signing a new deal, on 11 December 2020 the club announced Lopar had departed.

Career statistics

References

External links

football.ch profile 

1985 births
Living people
Swiss men's footballers
Switzerland youth international footballers
FC Wil players
FC Thun players
FC St. Gallen players
Western Sydney Wanderers FC players
Swiss Super League players
Swiss Challenge League players
Association football goalkeepers
People from Kreuzlingen
Sportspeople from Thurgau